Highway 41 is a very short cross-border spur in the Regional District of Kootenay Boundary in British Columbia. At just , it is the shortest numbered highway in the province. The highway was given the '41' designation in 1968. The reason the highway wasn't numbered "21" as a continuation of the Washington route, was because that highway number already existed in the Creston area.

References

041